Winifred McNair (née Winifred Margaret Slocock, 9 August 1877 – 28 March 1954) was a tennis player from Great Britain. She is best remembered for her women's doubles (partnering Kathleen McKane) gold medal at the 1920 Olympics in Antwerp, Belgium. Between 1906 and 1925 she competed in 15 editions of the Wimbledon Championships. Her best Wimbledon result came in 1913 when she reached the final of the all-comers' event and won the doubles title, partnering Dora Boothby.

She married Roderick McNair on 22 April 1908.

Grand Slam finals

Singles (1 runner-up)

1This was actually the all-comers final as Ethel Thomson Larcombe did not defend her 1912 Wimbledon title, which resulted in the winner of the all-comers final winning the challenge round and, thus, Wimbledon in 1913 by walkover.

Doubles (1 title)

References

External links
 
 

1877 births
1954 deaths
English Olympic medallists
Olympic gold medallists for Great Britain
Olympic tennis players of Great Britain
Tennis players at the 1920 Summer Olympics
Wimbledon champions (pre-Open Era)
Place of birth missing
Olympic medalists in tennis
Grand Slam (tennis) champions in women's doubles
Medalists at the 1920 Summer Olympics
People from Shaw-cum-Donnington
English female tennis players
Tennis people from Berkshire